Havar (also Romanized as Hāvar and, on Google Earth, as Haver) is a village in Almeh Rural District, Samalqan District, Maneh and Samalqan County, North Khorasan Province, Iran. At the 2006 census, its population was 228 inhabitants, distributed amongst 56 families. 
Havar is noteworthy for marking the Easternmost extremity of the highly biodiverse Caspian Hyrcanian mixed forests – most of which are to be found fringing the Caspian Sea. The spur – almost 'Island' – of forest which Havar shares with the villages of Jowzak, Darkesh and Kashanak (alternative spelling 'Keshanak') owes its extension into the more arid regions to the East of the Caspian sea to the trapping of moisture from that sea by the Aladagh Mountains, which form an extension, of lower altitude, of the Alborz mountains to the West. This forested area lies within the Khorasani Kurdish region of Northeastern Iran and Southwestern Turkmenistan. The only settlement of any size close to Havar and its neighbouring villages is Bojnord the capital of North Khorasan Province.

References 

Populated places in Maneh and Samalqan County